Elizabeth Burns may refer to:

Elizabeth Burns (philosopher), British philosopher
Elizabeth Burns (poet) (1957–2015), English poet
Elizabeth 'Betty' Burns (1791–1873), Scottish social figure